The John Wolfe House is a historic house on 905 W. Cheyenne Rd., Colorado Springs, Colorado that was owned by homesteader and prospector John Wolfe. It is on the National Register of Historic Places listings in El Paso County, Colorado.

The house was built in 1894  and is currently abandoned. All of the windows are boarded up (seen on picture).

References

Buildings and structures in Colorado Springs, Colorado
Houses in El Paso County, Colorado